The 2017 Kaspersky Riga Masters was a professional ranking snooker tournament that took place between 23 and 25 June 2017 at the Arena Riga in Riga, Latvia. It was the first ranking event of the 2017/2018 season. The tournament was broadcast by Eurosport.

Neil Robertson was the defending champion, but he lost in the first round to Lukas Kleckers.

Ryan Day claimed the first ranking title of his career by defeating Stephen Maguire 5–2 in the final.

Prize fund
The breakdown of prize money for this year is shown below:

 Winner: £50,000
 Runner-up: £25,000
 Semi-final: £15,000
 Quarter-final: £6,000
 Last 16: £4,000
 Last 32: £2,000
 Last 64: £1,000

 Highest break: £2,000
 Total: £227,000

The "rolling 147 prize" for a maximum break stood at £10,000

Main draw

Final

Qualifying
These matches were played between 31 May and 2 June 2017 at the Preston Guild Hall in Preston, England. All matches were best of 7 frames.

Notes

Century breaks

Main stage centuries
Total: 24

 140  Andrew Higginson
 139, 119, 112  Stephen Maguire
 139  Alexander Ursenbacher
 137, 109  Neil Robertson
 135  Robin Hull
 134  Mark Davis
 130  Mark Williams
 129  Joe Perry
 129  Eden Sharav
 129  Robbie Williams

 126  Ken Doherty
 119, 100  Ryan Day
 119  Barry Hawkins
 113  Zhang Anda
 112  Kurt Maflin
 112  Tian Pengfei
 107  Mark Joyce
 102  Stuart Carrington
 102  Jack Lisowski
 102  Kyren Wilson

Qualifying stage centuries
Total: 14

 132, 127  Xiao Guodong
 132, 109  Jimmy Robertson
 127  Kurt Maflin
 124  Matthew Selt
 124  Zhang Anda
 123  Ben Woollaston

 121  Declan Brennan
 116  Thepchaiya Un-Nooh
 115  Gary Wilson
 104  Graeme Dott
 102  Peter Ebdon
 101  Craig Steadman

References

2017
Riga Masters (snooker)
Riga Masters (snooker)
May 2017 sports events in Europe
June 2017 sports events in Europe